María Andrea Sánchez Piñón (born 31 March 1994) is a Mexican professional football defender who currently plays for FC Juárez of the Liga MX Femenil.

Honours

Club
Guadalajara
Liga MX Femenil: Apertura 2017

References

External links
 
 Andrea Sánchez at C.D. Guadalajara Femenil 
 

1994 births
Living people
People from Ocotlán, Jalisco
Footballers from Jalisco
Mexican women's footballers
Women's association football defenders
C.D. Guadalajara (women) footballers
Liga MX Femenil players
Mexico women's international footballers
Mexican footballers